John Rafferty may refer to:

John Rafferty Jr. (born 1953), Pennsylvania politician
John Rafferty (Canadian politician) (born 1953), Ontario politician
John Chandler Rafferty (1816–1880), New York and New Jersey politician
John K. Rafferty (born 1938), American politician in New Jersey
John Rafferty (footballer)

See also
Jack Rafferty, fictional character